Leonard Matheson Norris, better known as Len Norris (1913 in London, England – 1997 in Langley, British Columbia, Canada), was a longtime editorial cartoonist for the Canadian newspaper Vancouver Sun from 1950 to 1988.  Called by Walt Kelly, the creator of Pogo, "the best in the business", Norris' cartoons skewered the foibles of British Columbia politics and social mores with a barbed pencil. His intricate drawings were full of subtle detail, with several sideplots tucked into the frame, with everything from sardonic pictures on the living room wall to what the kids or the cat are doing in the corner while the main action is going on, typically with painfully ironic dialogue.  Norris cartoons remain popular today even though much of their original political or social context is gone.

Recurring themes and characters in Norris cartoons included the sarcastic Amblesnide and Tiddlycove, a parody of the tweedy West Vancouver neighbourhoods of Ambleside and Dundarave; "Rodney", a caricature of an Anglo-centric monarchical Canadian; the "Socred cow" for the British Columbia government's liquor stores; and lampoons of the Pacific Great Eastern Railway.

A copy of his cartoon, showing a mythical day in the famed Studio G at CBC Radio on Jarvis Street sometime in the early 1960s, illustrating some of the luminaries of the great days of radio, has been preserved in the resurrected Celebrity Club at PAL Place in Toronto as a 15-foot mural.

Len Norris received an honorary doctorate from the University of Windsor. One of his famous "Brockton Oval" cricket cartoons was re-produced on a limited edition T-shirt for the University of Windsor's "Senior Seminar" participants in the 1960s. There is still a small private collection of both his sketches and his final art work cartoons held by a collector of political cartoons in the Windsor, Ontario, region.

References

External links
Simon Fraser University Len Norris Collection intro
SFU Online Len Norris Cartoon Archive
The SFU Library Editorial Cartoons Collection
http://www.vancouversun.com/news/This+history+Award+winning+cartoonist+born+England/9234373/story.html

1913 births
1997 deaths
Canadian editorial cartoonists
Vancouver Sun people
British emigrants to Canada